Aloe volkensii is a species of plant widely distributed in East Africa.

Description
Aloe volkensii forms a tall, stiffly-erect stem, up to 4 meters tall. It occasionally develops an offset or two from its base. 
The long (c.60 cm), slender, grey-green leaves are recurved. The leaves bear brown-tipped teeth on their margins. Dead leaves are persistent and remain on the stem just below the rosette (unlike those of the rare Aloe ballyi). The leaves of juvenile plants have occasional pale spots. Its orange-red flowers are 35mm long, and born on subcapitate racemes, on an erect inflorescence with up to ten branches from lower on the inflorescence.

Distribution
This species occurs from southern Kenya, across almost all of Tanzania, and as far west as Rwanda and Uganda. It grows in dry bushveld, usually on rocky slopes.

References

Notes

volkensii
Flora of Kenya
Flora of Tanzania